Duke of Montalto was a hereditary title in the Peerage of Spain, accompanied by the dignity of Grandee and granted in 1507 by Ferdinand II to his nephew Fernando de Aragón y Guardato, who was an illegitimate son of Ferdinand I of Naples.

In 1958, Luisa Isabel Álvarez de Toledo, 21st Duchess of Medina Sidonia, daughter of the last Duke, requested the rehabilitation of the Dukedom with the denomination of "Montalto de Aragón", so to differentiate it from the existing Dukedom of Montalto also granted in 1507 by Ferdinand II. The Francoist Government did not accept this request for unknown reasons, and so the title became extinct.

Dukes of Montalto (1507)

Fernando de Aragón y Guardato, 1st Duke of Montalto
Antonio de Aragón y Cardona, 2nd Duke of Montalto
Pedro de Aragón y Cardona, 3rd Duke of Montalto
Antonio de Aragón y Cardona, 4th Duke of Montalto
María de Aragón y de la Cerda, 5th Duchess of Montalto
Antonio de Aragón y Moncada, 6th Duke of Montalto
Luis Guillermo Moncada y de Aragón, 7th Duke of Montalto
Fernando de Aragón y Moncada, 8th Duke of Montalto
Catalina de Moncada y Aragón, 9th Duchess of Montalto
Fadrique Vicente Álvarez de Toledo Osorio y Moncada, 10th Duke of Montalto
Antonio Álvarez de Toledo Osorio y Pérez de Guzmán, 11th Duke of Montalto
José Álvarez de Toledo, Duke of Alba, 12th Duke of Montalto
Francisco de Borja Álvarez de Toledo Osorio y Gonzaga, 13th Duke of Montalto
Pedro de Alcántara Álvarez de Toledo y Palafox, 14th Duke of Montalto
José Joaquín Álvarez de Toledo y Silva, 15th Duke of Montalto
José Joaquín Álvarez de Toledo y Caro, 16th Duke of Montalto
Joaquín Álvarez de Toledo y Caro, 17th Duke of Montalto

See also
Kingdom of Aragon
Kingdom of Naples

References 

Dukedoms of Spain
Grandees of Spain
Lists of dukes
Lists of Spanish nobility